was a member of the royal family in Japan during the Asuka period. He was the eldest son of Emperor Tenmu. He fought on the side of his father in the Jinshin War (672), a battle of succession, which resulted in his father becoming Emperor. At the age of 19, he was dispatched by his father to the battle front in what is now Fuwa District, Mino Province (now the southern part of Gifu Prefecture) as vanguard and general commander. In 679, while in Yoshino with his father, he swore to an oath of cooperation with his siblings. When Empress Jitō ascended to the throne in 686 he became the Daijō-daijin and handled government affairs. He died suddenly in 696, thought by some to be an assassination.

He loved Princess Tōchi (his elder half-sister, Prince Ōtomo's wife). He left only three waka poems during his whole life, but they were all poetry offered to her.

Family
Parents
Father: Emperor Tenmu (天武天皇, c. 631 – 1 October 686) 
Mother: Munakata no Amako-no-iratsume (胸形尼子娘), unakata-no-Kimi Tokuzen's daughter
Consorts and issues
Consort (Hi): Princess Minabe (御名部皇女), Emperor Tenji's daughter and Empress Genmei's  full-sister 
First Son: Prince Nagaya (長屋王 , 684 – 20 March 729) 
Second Son: Prince Suzuka (鈴鹿王, d. 3 October 745)
Consort (Hi): Princess Tajima (但馬皇女), Emperor Tenmu's daughter and Prince Takechi's half-sister
Unknown mother
Third Son: Prince Kadobe (門部王)
First Daughter: Princess Yamagata (山形女王, d. 5 October 745)
Second Daughter: Princess Kawachi (河内女王, d. 5 February 780)
Third Daughter: Princess Hinokuma (檜前女王)

References
Yoshida Takashi 吉田 隆 (1999), 飛鳥・奈良時代 Asuka Nara Jidai (Asuka and Nara Period), Iwanami Junior Shinsho, p. 71

Japanese princes
650s births
696 deaths
Sons of emperors